The 1927 East Tennessee State Teachers football team was an American football team that represented East Tennessee State Teacher's College—now known as East Tennessee State University (ETSU)—as an independent in the 1927 college football season. They were led by third-year coach John Robinson. Robinson was assisted by William "Willie" Flinn Rogers, who taught history and government at the school from 1925 to 1968. According to Old Hickory, the 1927 season presented Robinson with a similar task to previous years, which was to develop a team out of "green material". Of their losses, they were blanked in all except against , where they scored six points.

Schedule

References

East Tennessee State Teachers
East Tennessee State Buccaneers football seasons
East Tennessee State Teachers football